debugfs is a special file system available in the Linux kernel since version 2.6.10-rc3. It was written by Greg Kroah-Hartman.

debugfs is a simple-to-use RAM-based file system specially designed for debugging purposes. It exists as a simple way for kernel developers to make information available to user space.  Unlike , which is only meant for information about a process, or sysfs, which has strict one-value-per-file rules, debugfs has no rules at all.  Developers can put any information they want there.

Use 
To compile a Linux kernel with the debugfs facility, the  option must be set to yes.

mount -t debugfs none /sys/kernel/debug

It can be manipulated using several calls from the C header file , which include:
  for creating a file in the debug filesystem.
  for creating a directory inside the debug filesystem.
  for creating a symbolic link inside the debug filesystem.
  for removing a debugfs entry from the debug filesystem.

References

External links 
 An updated guide to debugfs at LWN

Linux kernel
Linux kernel features